Vir Singh Deo, also known as Bir Singh Dev, was a Bundela Rajput chief and the ruler of the kingdom of Orchha. He was a vassal of the Mughal Empire. and ruled between 1605 and either 1626 or 1627.
Vir Singh Deo assassinated Abul Fazl who was returning from Deccan in a plot contrived by the Mughal Prince Salim.
According to Aruna, he is "the most famous and most powerful of all the Orchha Chiefs. A man of dashing personality, a great warrior and no scruples, a bold and organised administrator". He was considered to built the Jhansi fort

Deo was among the Rajput rulers of his era who sponsored temples in the Brajmandal area that comprised Vrindavan and Mathura. In addition, the Phool Bagh gardens, and the Lakshmi temple were all built by Deo. His mausoleum is located in Orchha, and features both Hindu and Mughal architecture.

Vir Singh Deo was succeeded by Jhujhar Singh,  the first-born son of the senior of his three queens.

Deo was patron to the poet Keshavdas, who wrote the 1607 hagiographic work Virsimdevcarit (Deeds of Vir Singh Deo).

References

Mughal nobility
Rajput rulers
Bundelkhand
Tikamgarh district
17th-century Indian monarchs
Orchha